Simon Francis Lee (born 29 March 1957 in Gillingham, Kent) is a Professor of Law at Aston University, Visiting Fellow, St Edmund's College, Cambridge, and Emeritus Professor of Jurisprudence at Queen's University Belfast. He was Rector of Liverpool Hope University from 1995 to 2003.

Early life

Lee attended school in Gillingham before winning the Brackenbury scholarship to read Jurisprudence at Balliol College, Oxford. Where in 1977, he won the Sweet & Maxwell Prize for the University of Oxford "Best Distinction in Law Moderations." In 1978, he won the Winter Williams Essay Prize and in 1979 took first class honours. He then attended Yale Law School studying for the LLM as a Harkness Fellow.

Career
He taught law at Trinity College, Oxford, and then King's College London.

Simon Lee writes about law, ethics, religion, politics, history and sport.

Belfast
In 1989 he was appointed Professor of Jurisprudence at Queen's University, Belfast. Dean Godson, in Himself Alone, his 2004 (HarperCollins) biography of David Trimble (who went on to become First Minister of Northern Ireland and to win the Nobel Peace Prize), wrote that Lee's appointment in 1988 at the age of 31 to the chair of jurisprudence at Queen's University Belfast, ahead of the insider candidate David Trimble, was because he was a 'superstar' academic 'with good media credentials' (p. 93).  He then became a regular commentator on BBC television and radio in Northern Ireland and in the press. Whilst at Queen's he co-founded, with Robin Wilson, 'Initiative ‘92, "A citizens’ inquiry"' through which opinions were sought across the Northern Ireland community and political parties on ways forward and was chaired by Torkel Opsahl from Norway.

Liverpool

On his return from Queen's Professor Lee became Gresham Professor of Law (1995-1998). Also in 1995, Lee became Chief Executive and Rector of Liverpool Institute of Higher Education (LIHE). Within weeks of Lee being appointed Rector in 1995 the LIHE community and the Governing Council had agreed a new name, Liverpool Hope, and a new mission statement – "Educating the whole person in mind, body and spirit" Liverpool Hope became the first college in the UK to secure degree-awarding powers under the government's new system. Lee's leadership of this ecumenical church college is discussed in a book of essays, The Foundation of Hope, edited by R John Elford and published by Liverpool University Press in 2003. At Liverpool Hope he served under bishop David Sheppard. Hope won the Freedom of the City of Liverpool and a Queen's Anniversary Prize for the work of Hope One World with Tibetan refugee children in Ladakh. On 26 January 2016 Liverpool Hope University presented Professor Lee with an honorary degree in recognition of his time as Rector & Chief Executive of Liverpool Hope University College from 1995-2003. During this time, he proposed the name 'Hope', the development of the Creative Campus at Everton, and the Network of Hope partnership. He suggested 'educating the whole person to sum up Liverpool Hope, adding 'in mind, body and spirit'.

Leeds

Following his appointment as Vice-Chancellor at Leeds Metropolitan University in 2003, he announced in his inaugural lecture that the university would develop a Rose Bowl behind the Civic Hall which duly happened (it won the Design & Innovation category at the RICS Pro-Yorkshire Awards 2010 and "best new venue to the property industry") together with other estate developments he initiated. The partnership with Leeds Rugby resulted in the rugby and cricket stadium becoming an extension of the Headingley campus, with its Carnegie Stand for rugby giving the University's Carnegie campus a permanent base at the Stadium. The Carnegie Stand incorporates 12 classrooms and tripled the number of disabled spaces formerly available at Headingley Carnegie Stadium. The Carnegie Pavilion replaced the existing YCCC media and player facilities at Headingley Carnegie Stadium and enables the venue to continue to host international fixtures. The £21m Carnegie Pavilion project was supported by Yorkshire Forward, Leeds Council, HSBC, The England and Wales Cricket Board (ECB) and Sport England.

The university agreed to pay back £8 million of public money as the price for handing back its controlling interest in the rugby club, which was arranged by Lee, a rugby enthusiast and described as "staggering" by Phil Willis MP.

In the annual Times Higher Awards 2006, the University won the category of Outstanding Contribution by a University to the Local Community, for its work with Bradford City Football Club and the local Muslim community in Manningham, and silver for the overall University of the Year.

In 2007 the University won awards for Arts & Business, for its partnership with Northern Ballet, and for being the most environmentally friendly university in the country, in the inaugural league table compiled by the green action group, People & Planet. In 2008 the university won the bidding process for the UK Centre of Coaching Excellence through to the 2016 Olympics and the national award for the best coaching environment of any organization in the country.  In 2009, the University came 3rd in the BUCS league table for all UK university sport, having risen from 27th during his leadership. 
.
Lee replaced the university's previous owl logo with a Yorkshire rose.

In November 2008, the chair of governors at Leeds Beckett University (then Leeds Metropolitan University), Ninian Watt, informed Professor Lee that serious complaints regarding his treatment of staff had been made by a number of staff in the university in such a way that these could not be ignored. Rather than face a suspension, Professor Lee opted to resign and signed a compromise agreement.

Leeds Metropolitan University announced Simon Lee's resignation on 14 January 2009. The resignation of Lee was preceded, two days earlier, by the resignation of Sir Brendan Foster, in support of Lee. In accepting the resignation of Sir Brendan Foster Mr Watt made the following comments about the future of the university and his appreciation of the contribution of professor Lee, commenting that "Dr Geoff Hitchins, a former vice-chancellor of the university, was appointed acting chief executive on Wednesday.Mr Watt said Dr Hitchins would lead the university's management team until a new vice-chancellor was appointed.

He added: "The whole board want to acknowledge the transformation of the university under the leadership of Professor Lee. The university is in a very strong position and we will build on that." In an article for the Times Higher Professor outlined the issues for leaving Leeds Metropolitan University and provides an clarity on the issues surrounding his resignation. This also includes the following statement from Mr Watt "“I should like to thank you, personally and on behalf of the board of governors of the university, for the very considerable success you have had as vice-chancellor over a period of what will be six years,” Mr Watt wrote. “In particular you have led the transformation of the university’s estate, revitalised the ‘Carnegie’ brand, transformed the external perception of the university and achieved the designation of the UK Centre for Coaching Excellence. For all of this I thank you most sincerely. May I also wish you every success in your future career.” Following the departure of Professor Lee an audit of senior managers expenses, including accusations about Professor Lee, was undertaken by KPMG. The outcome resulted in a complete exoneration of Professor Lee.

Current role

Lee currently undertakes a research leadership role and is a professor at the Aston University Law School.

He is the author of eight books. Lee has written extensively on medical ethics. Today he is continuing to create partnership opportunities for organizations. He is the chair of a new charity inaugurated by Pope Benedict XVI called the John Paul II Foundation For Sport. From Burnley Football Club to the University of Oxford, he is linking sport with education. The result of all these partnerships is to build stronger links between educational institutions, businesses, and the community". <Citation, www.VTS.edu 2011>.

Some recent works by Lee include the following:
2016    https://ukconstitutionallaw.org/2016/11/29/simon-lee-dicey-sentiments/ 
2018    https://judicialpowerproject.org.uk/simon-lee-judicial-power-what-is-left-unsaid/ 
2019    https://ukconstitutionallaw.org/2019/09/26/simon-lee-the-supremes-seventh-dominant-or-diminished/ 
2017    https://sixtybookworkout.wordpress.com/ 
2018    https://uptoyouskip.net/   A Balliol quartet and the welfare state: Temple, Beveridge, Tawney and Toynbee - Simon Lee, 2022 (sagepub.com) https://williamtemplefoundation.org.uk/death-is-something-after-all/

References

Vice-Chancellors by university in England
People associated with Leeds Beckett University
Alumni of Balliol College, Oxford
British legal scholars
People from Gillingham, Kent
1957 births
Living people
Academics of King's College London
Academics of Liverpool Hope University